The 1985 Dwars door België was the 40th edition of the Dwars door Vlaanderen cycle race and was held on 22 March 1985. The race started and finished in Waregem. The race was won by Eddy Planckaert.

General classification

References

1985
1985 in road cycling
1985 in Belgian sport
March 1985 sports events in Europe